Denisovka is a rural locality (a village) in Ivanovskoye Rural Settlement, Kovrovsky District, Vladimir Oblast, Russia. The population was 33 as of 2010.

Geography 
Denisovka is located 34 km south of Kovrov (the district's administrative centre) by road. Voskhod is the nearest rural locality.

References 

Rural localities in Kovrovsky District